Milebush is a hamlet about one mile (1.6 km) north of Marden  in the Maidstone district of Kent, England. It lies on the B2079 road surrounded by apple orchards.

Notable people
Beric Morley, English architectural historian

Hamlets in Kent